Many ships of the French Navy have borne the name Vénus in honour of the Roman goddess of love Venus:

 , a 16-gun frigate
 , a 26-gun frigate
 , a 32-gun frigate, lead ship of her class.
 , a 
 , a 26-gun corvette
 , a captured 20-gun Dutch corvette
 , a captured Venetian galley
 , a fluyt
 , a 
 , a captured 20-gun Dutch corvette
 , a 52-gun frigate, lead ship of her class.
 , a steam frigate, lead ship of her class.
 , an armed cargo ship
 , an armed cargo ship
 , a 
  (1966), a 

also:
 , a trawler requisitioned 1914-1919 and 1940-1940
 , a fishing vessel requisitioned 1918-1919
 , a trawler requisitioned 1914-1919 and, as Vénus II (AD76), 1939-1940
 , a trawler requisitioned 1914-1916
 , a trawler requisitioned 1915-1919

Sources and references
 
 
 NetMarine

French Navy ship names